Akuni  is a village in Chanditala I community development block of Srirampore subdivision in Hooghly district in the Indian state of West Bengal.

Geography

Gram panchayat
Villages in Ainya gram panchayat are: Akuni, Aniya, Bandpur, Banipur, Bara Choughara, Dudhkanra, Ganeshpur, Goplapur, Jiara, Kalyanbati, Mukundapur, Sadpur and Shyamsundarpur.

Demographics
As per 2011 Census of India Akuni had a total population of 3,759 of which 1,859 (49%) were males and 1,900 (51%) were females. Population below 6 years was 511. The total number of literates in Akuni was 2,590 (79.74% of the population over 6 years).

Education
Akuni B.G. Biharilal Institution is a coeducational higher secondary school at Akuni. It has arrangements for teaching Bengali, English, history, philosophy, political science, economics, eco-geography, education, accountancy, business economics & mathematics, mathematics, physics, chemistry, bio-science, computer application and computer science.

Healthcare 
Akuni Ichhapasar Rural Hospital at Aniya functions with 30 beds.

Transport
Bargachia railway station and Baruipara railway station are the nearest railway stations.

References 

Villages in Chanditala I CD Block